The 2020–2021 Candidates Tournament was an eight-player chess double round-robin tournament to decide the challenger for the World Chess Championship 2021, played in Yekaterinburg, Russia. Ian Nepomniachtchi won the tournament with a round to spare and earned the right to challenge the defending world champion, Magnus Carlsen.

The first half of the tournament was played from 17 to 25 March 2020. It was suspended at the halfway point due to the COVID-19 pandemic, with the second half of the tournament played from 19 to 27 April 2021. Over 13 months from beginning to end, it is believed to be the longest over-the-board chess tournament in history.

Participants 

The qualifiers for the Candidates Tournament were:

The regulations stated that if one or more players declined the invitation to play in the Candidates Tournament, the players with the next highest average ratings would qualify. On 6 March, this rule was used to select Vachier-Lagrave, after Radjabov withdrew.

Compared to previous cycles (2014, 2016, 2018), the Grand Swiss was a new addition, and the number of qualifiers by rating was reduced from two to one. The format of the Grand Prix tournament was also changed.

Qualifier by rating 

The qualifier on rating was the player with the highest average rating for the 12 ratings periods from February 2019 to January 2020, who did not qualify by another method. To be eligible, a player must have played at least 30 games during the 12 ratings periods, and at least 18 in the final 6 ratings periods.

The following table shows the ratings of the players with the top average ratings from February 2019 to January 2020. It includes the first eleven players except for world champion Magnus Carlsen, Fabiano Caruana (who qualified as the 2018 challenger), Ding Liren (who qualified as a finalist of the 2019 World Cup), Alexander Grischuk and Ian Nepomniachtchi (the winner and runner-up of the 2019 FIDE Grand Prix). All of the players in the table met the above game count requirements.

The qualifier by rating was Anish Giri.

Wild card 

One wild card was selected by the organizer. This player must have participated in at least two of the three qualifying tournaments (World Cup, Grand Swiss and Grand Prix) and also must have met one of the following conditions: highest non-qualifier in the World Cup and also in the final 4 of the World Cup; highest non-qualifier in the Grand Swiss or Grand Prix; or in the top 10 by average rating from February 2019 to January 2020.

Four players were eligible: Maxime Vachier-Lagrave (third in the World Cup, third in the Grand Prix, fifth on the rating list); Kirill Alekseenko (highest non-qualifier in the Grand Swiss and also played in the World Cup); Shakhriyar Mamedyarov (sixth on the rating list, played in the World Cup and Grand Prix) and Levon Aronian (tenth on the rating list, played in the World Cup and Grand Prix). Viswanathan Anand was ninth on the rating list but only participated in the Grand Swiss, and thus was ineligible to be picked as the wild card player.

On 11 November 2019, Andrey Filatov, the president of the Russian Chess Federation, announced the intention to use the wild card to choose a Russian player, stating: "The decision to host this event in Russia guarantees that there will be a Russian player participating. We’re still considering different options how we’ll choose a Russian wild-card, but it will probably be a match or match-tournament with Kirill Alekseenko [...]." At the time of the announcement no Russian had qualified for the Candidates; and Alekseenko, Grischuk and Nepomniachtchi were sure to be eligible for the wild card, although the latter two also had a chance to qualify via the Grand Prix.

On 22 December 2019, the Grand Prix results were finalised, with Grischuk and Nepomniachtchi qualifying, meaning Alekseenko was the only Russian eligible for the wild card.

On 23 December 2019, the Russian Chess Federation officially nominated Kirill Alekseenko as the wild card.

On the same day, managers of Maxime Vachier-Lagrave expressed their concern with the current FIDE rules in an open letter to the Russian Chess Federation, asking to organize a match between Vachier-Lagrave and Alekseenko for their wild card placement, on the basis that Vachier-Lagrave was eligible for the wild card in three different ways. However, Alekseenko was confirmed as the wild card. Alekseenko himself encouraged the abolition of the wild card in a later interview.

Organization 

The tournament was an eight player, double round-robin tournament, meaning there were 14 rounds with each player facing each other twice: once with the black pieces and once with the white pieces. The tournament winner qualified to play Magnus Carlsen for the World Championship late in 2021.

Regulations 

The time control was 100 minutes for the first 40 moves, 50 minutes for the next 20 moves and then 15 minutes for the rest of the game; plus a 30-second increment per move starting from move 1.

In the event of a tie, tie breaks were applied in the following order: 1) head-to-head score among tied players, 2) total number of wins, 3) Sonneborn–Berger score (SB), 4) rapid chess tie-break games (for first place only). If more than two players were tied for first after the first three tie-break methods, then the two players to play the tie-break were to be decided by lot.

The prize money was: €48,000 for first place, €36,000 for second place, €24,000 for third place (with players on the same number of points sharing prize money, irrespective of tie-breaks); plus €7,000 per point for every player; giving a total prize pool of €500,000.

Schedule 

FIDE announced the pairings on 14 February 2020. The original schedule had the final round on 3 April and the closing ceremony on 4 April 2020. The revised schedule was announced on 16 February 2021.

All games began at 16:00 local time (11:00 UTC), except Round 14, which began at 15:00 local time (10:00 UTC).

Players from the same country must play each other in the earlier rounds: Ding Liren and Wang Hao played each other in rounds 1 and 8; while Grischuk, Nepomniachtchi and Alekseenko played each other in rounds 1 to 3 and rounds 8 to 10.

Impact of coronavirus on the tournament

Ding Liren and Wang Hao 

The COVID-19 pandemic, which was mainly confined to China in January and early February 2020, affected the preparation of the Chinese players,  Wang Hao and Ding Liren. On 10 February, both players admitted that they cancelled their training camps and had to prepare online with their assistants: Ding Liren was training in his home city of Wenzhou; while Wang Hao was out of China, and planned to only briefly return to China before the Candidates. Wang Hao later decided to not return to China at all before the tournament.

On 19 February, Russia announced a partial ban on Chinese nationals entering the country due to the coronavirus outbreak in China. FIDE announced that the Chinese delegation was travelling on humanitarian visas and therefore would be permitted to enter Russia, but they were advised to come "well in advance" before the tournament.

On 2 March, Ding Liren and his team passed the Russian border control in Moscow and went to an isolated cottage house at the outskirts of Moscow, for two weeks of medical quarantine and observation before the start of the tournament.

Radjabov withdraws, replaced by Vachier-Lagrave 

On 6 March, citing concerns over the COVID-19 pandemic and FIDE's handling of the related risk-management, Teimour Radjabov withdrew from the tournament. His place was filled by Maxime Vachier-Lagrave, as he was next on the  qualifier by rating list.

Radjabov had asked FIDE to postpone the event due to the coronavirus outbreak. FIDE responded that this could not be done "legally and practically", and gave Radjabov until 6 March to confirm his participation; Radjabov responded by formally withdrawing.

FIDE's new regulations on playing conditions 

On 7 March, FIDE announced that the tournament could only be postponed by order of the Russian authorities, and stated this again on 14 March: ″It is not the responsibility of FIDE to cancel FIDE-rated tournaments in any given Federation. Each Federation may take their own decisions ...″

FIDE also announced health and safety measures, including screening of visitors for body temperature, and making handshakes optional.

If one of the players would test positive for COVID-19, the tournament would be stopped immediately and resumed later in the year, with points counting from games already played.

FIDE suspends the tournament 

The first seven rounds proceeded as scheduled, between 17 and 25 March, with round eight scheduled for 26 March. But on 26 March, the Russian government announced an interruption of air traffic with foreign countries, taking effect on 27 March. This prompted FIDE to suspend the tournament on 26 March, as FIDE could not guarantee players' and officials' return upon the completion of the tournament. Under the tournament conditions, the scores from the first seven rounds were retained.

The status of Radjabov 

As a consequence of the postponement, Radjabov called for his reinstatement in the tournament, as well as considering legal action if he were not reinstated. In a May 2020 interview, FIDE President Arkady Dvorkovich indicated that his preference was to give Radjabov a wildcard for the next cycle in 2022, subject to approval from the FIDE Council.

In May 2021, FIDE confirmed that Radjabov was a qualifier for the 2022 Candidates Tournament.

Resumption of the tournament 

A resumption was initially announced by FIDE on 8 September 2020. The tournament was re-scheduled in the same host city of Yekaterinburg with the 8th round starting on 1 November 2020. Tbilisi,  Georgia, was named as a reserve venue.

However on 16 October 2020, FIDE postponed the resumption of the tournament, until the (northern hemisphere) spring of 2021. This was due to ongoing concerns about COVID-19, as well as the fact that the championship match with Carlsen was scheduled for November to December 2021, so it was not necessary to conclude the Candidates in 2020. Dvorkovich said that Yekaterinburg was still the likely venue.

On 16 February 2021, FIDE announced that the second half of the tournament would be played between 19 and 28 April, in Yekaterinburg.

Results

Standings 

Note: Numbers in the crosstable in a white background indicate the result playing the respective opponent with the white pieces (black pieces if on a black background).

Overview 

Nepomniachtchi took an early lead with wins in rounds 1, 5 and 6, but was caught by Vachier-Lagrave, who defeated him in round 7. The tournament was halted at the halfway point, with every player having played each other once. Vachier-Lagrave and Nepomniachtchi shared the lead on 4½/7, with Vachier-Lagrave's win in their individual game putting him provisionally ahead on tie-breaks. A point behind on 3½ were Caruana, Giri, Grischuk and Wang Hao. Ding Liren, who was one of the pre-tournament favourites, started the tournament badly with two consecutive losses, and shared last place on 2½ with Alekseenko.

When the tournament resumed, Caruana sprung a spectacular novelty on Vachier-Lagrave to eventually defeat him in round 8, and Nepomniachtchi was again the sole leader, a lead he extended to one point with a win over Alekseenko in round 10. Giri moved to within half a point of the lead (but with a worse tie-break than Nepomniachtchi) with wins over Wang Hao and Ding Liren in rounds 9 and 11. In round 12 Giri faced third-placed Caruana, in a game which both needed to win; Giri won, but Nepomniachtchi won against Wang Hao and kept his half-point lead; giving lead standings of Nepomniachtchi 8, Giri 7½, and Vachier-Lagrave 6½.

In round 13, both Giri (against Grischuk) and Vachier-Lagrave (against Nepomniachtchi) played for wins with the black pieces, but both obtained inferior positions. When Nepomniachtchi saw that Giri was losing, he offered Vachier-Lagrave a draw, which was accepted. This left the standings at Nepomniachtchi 8½, Giri 7½, Vachier-Lagrave and Caruana 7. With a superior tie break due to his 1½–½ head-to-head score against Giri, Nepomniachtchi won the tournament with one round to spare.

Results by round 

First named player is white. 1–0 indicates a white win, 0–1 indicates a black win, and ½–½ indicates a  draw. Numbers in parentheses show players' scores prior to the round.

Points by round 

For each player, the difference between wins and losses after each round is shown.
The players with the highest difference for each round are marked with green background.
The players with no more chance of advancing to the title match, in each round, are marked with red background.

Books 

 Grandmaster Dorian Rogozenco (2021). Eight Good Men: The 2020-2021 Candidates Tournament. [Limited Liability Company Elk and Ruby Publishing House]. .

References

External links 

 FIDE Candidates Tournament 2020, FIDE (official site)
 Daily reports and commentary at Chessbase: Round 1, *Round 2, Round 3, *Round 4, Round 5, *Round 6, Round 7.
Candidates Tournament 2020 , Live games from World Chess, Official FIDE Broadcasting.

2020
2020 in chess
2021 in chess
2020 in Russian sport
2021 in Russian sport
Chess in Russia
Sport in Yekaterinburg
International sports competitions hosted by Russia
March 2020 sports events in Russia
April 2021 sports events in Russia
Sports events postponed due to the COVID-19 pandemic